Formozov, or Formozova (feminine), is a Russian last name (from ) and may refer to:
  (1928—2009) — Soviet and Russian archaeologist and historian.
 Aleksandr Nikolaevich Formozov (1899—1973) — Soviet biologist.
 Nikolay Aleksandrovich Formozov (born 1955) — Soviet and Russian ecologist and biologist.

References 

Russian-language surnames